Daniel F. Whitcomb (1875–1944) was an American screenwriter of the silent era.

Selected filmography
 Sold at Auction (1917)
 Told at Twilight (1917)
 The Bride's Silence (1917)
 A Game of Wits (1917)
 The Locked Heart (1918)
 Rosemary Climbs the Heights (1918)
 The Blue Moon (1920)
 The Thirtieth Piece of Silver (1920)
 The House of Toys (1920)
 Their Mutual Child (1921)
 Sunset Jones (1921)
 Another Man's Boots (1922)
 At Devil's Gorge (1923)
 Spawn of the Desert (1923)
 Battling Bates (1923)
 The Desert Hawk (1924)

References

Bibliography
 Langman, Larry. A Guide to Silent Westerns. Greenwood Publishing Group, 1992.

External links

1875 births
1944 deaths
20th-century American screenwriters